The America Zone was one of the three regional zones of the 1959 Davis Cup.

7 teams entered the America Zone: 3 teams competed in the North & Central America Zone, while 4 teams competed in the South America Zone. The winner of each sub-zone would play against each other to determine who moved to the Inter-Zonal Zone to compete against the winners of the Eastern Zone and Europe Zone.

Australia defeated Canada in the North & Central America Zone final, and Cuba received a walkover in the South America Zone final after Argentina withdrew. In the Americas Inter-Zonal Final, Australia defeated Cuba and progressed to the Inter-Zonal Zone.

North & Central America Zone

Draw

Semifinals

Mexico vs. Australia

Final

Canada vs. Australia

South America Zone

Draw

Semifinals

Caribbean/West Indies vs. Cuba

Final

Cuba vs. Argentina
Cuba defeated Argentina by walkover.

Americas Inter-Zonal Final

Australia vs. Cuba

References

External links
Davis Cup official website

Davis Cup Americas Zone
America Zone
Davis Cup